Pila occidentalis is a species of freshwater snail with an operculum, an aquatic gastropod mollusk in the apple snails family, Ampullariidae. This species is found in Angola, Botswana, Namibia, and Zambia.

References

Ampullariidae
Gastropods described in 1887
Taxonomy articles created by Polbot